Zofia Wasilkowska (9 December 1910 in Kalisz – 1 December 1996 in Warsaw), was a Polish communist politician. She was a judge of the Supreme Court in 1948–1953 and 1955–1981 and Minister of Justice in 1956–1957. She was also responsible for women's affairs in 1948–1953.

References

1910 births
Politicians from Kalisz
People from Kalisz Governorate
University of Warsaw alumni
Polish communists
Women government ministers of Poland
1996 deaths
20th-century Polish judges
Justice ministers of Poland
Polish women lawyers
Female justice ministers
Members of the Central Committee of the Polish United Workers' Party
Ravensbrück concentration camp survivors
Burials at Powązki Cemetery
20th-century Polish women politicians